The 1960 United States presidential election in Mississippi took place on November 8, 1960, as part of the 1960 United States presidential election. Voters chose eight representatives, or electors to the Electoral College, who voted for president and vice president. This was the last election in which Mississippi had eight electoral votes: the Great Migration caused the state to lose congressional districts for the third time in four censuses before the next election.

The election saw the only case of a state being carried by a slate of unpledged electors. The Magnolia State voted narrowly for this slate, who voted unanimously for long-time Virginia Senator and political machine director Harry Flood Byrd, over the national Democratic nominee John F. Kennedy. Republican nominee and outgoing vice-President Richard Nixon came in third, with his percentage of the vote practically unchanged from what President Dwight D. Eisenhower recorded in 1956.

Governor Ross Barnett, a segregationist, was faced with a severe dilemma upon becoming governor at the beginning of the year owing to the rigid opposition of Mississippi's limited and almost exclusively white electorate to the active Civil Rights Movement. Pressured by the "Citizens' Council" who wished to unite the South behind a white-supremacist Democratic candidate, Governor Barnett repeated James P. Coleman's strategy from 1956 and nominated two sets of Democratic Party electors for the presidential ballot. The first slate was pledged to Kennedy, while the other was not pledged to any candidate. The aim of placing unpledged electors on the ballot was to gain leverage from either major party in a close election.

Because Kennedy's record on civil rights was considered poor by the movement's supporters, Senators John C. Stennis and James Eastland supported his candidacy, although state-level politicians were not at all supportive. Outside the heavily French-settled coastal counties, which have greater cultural ties with Louisiana than with the rest of Mississippi, Kennedy's Catholic faith was also considered suspect. In these coastal counties, Kennedy improved very considerably upon what Adlai Stevenson II had achieved in 1956, but except for those counties around the cities of Natchez and Vicksburg, Kennedy showed a major decline from the Democratic result in 1956. Since the Republican percentage of the vote essentially failed to change – Nixon lost heavily French Hancock County to Kennedy and Adams and Warren to the unpledged slate but picked up Tunica County and Lowndes County – the unpledged slate took almost all of Kennedy's lost votes and thus shaded him for the state overall.

Despite Kennedy's statewide defeat being only the second for a national Democrat in Mississippi since Reconstruction, this remains the last election when the coastal, French-influenced counties of Harrison and Jackson have voted for a Democratic presidential nominee. The following landlocked counties have also never voted Democratic since: Choctaw, Jones and Smith. Warren County would not vote Democratic again until Barack Obama won it in 2012.

Results

Results by county

Notes

References

Mississippi
1960
1960 Mississippi elections